Elections to Bolton Metropolitan Borough Council were held on 6 May 1999. One third of the council was up for election and the Labour Party kept overall control of the council.

20 seats were contested in the election, with 11 being won by the Labour Party, 5 by the Liberal Democrats and 4 by the Conservatives.

After the election, the composition of the council was:
Labour 41
Conservative 10
Liberal Democrat 9

Election result

Council Composition
Prior to the election the composition of the council was:

After the election the composition of the council was:

LD – Liberal Democrats

Ward results

Astley Bridge ward

Blackrod ward

Bradshaw ward

Breightmet ward

Bromley Cross ward

Burnden ward

Central ward

Daubhill ward

Deane-cum-Heaton ward

Derby ward

Farnworth ward

Halliwell ward

Harper Green ward

Horwich ward

Hulton Park ward

Kearsley ward

Little Lever ward

Smithills ward

Tonge ward

Westhoughton ward

Sources

Notes

References
 

1999
1999 English local elections
1990s in Greater Manchester